The Administration of Radioactive Substances Advisory Committee (ARSAC) is an advisory non-departmental public body of the government of the United Kingdom. It is sponsored by the Department of Health.

The committee advises government on the certification of doctors and dentists who want to use radioactive medicinal products on people.

Doctors and dentists who use radioactive medicinal products (radiopharmaceuticals) on people must get a certificate from health ministers. This certificate allows them to use radioactive medicinal products in diagnosis, therapy and research.

ARSAC was set up to advise health ministers with respect to the grant, renewal, suspension, revocation and variation of certificates and generally in connection with the system of prior authorisation required by Article 5(a) of Council Directive 76/579/Euratom.

The majority of ARSAC's members are medical doctors who are appointed to the committee as independent experts in their field (for example nuclear medicine). The committee comments on applications in confidence to the ARSAC Support Unit, Public Health England. No individual committee member approves any single application.

An official from the Department of Health authorises successful applications on behalf of the Secretary of State.

See also
 Centre for Radiation, Chemical and Environmental Hazards in Oxfordshire

References

External links 
 

  

Nuclear medicine organizations
Non-departmental public bodies of the United Kingdom government